Millipedes, myriapods of the class Diplopoda, contain approximately 12,000 described species organized into 16 extant orders and approximately 140 families. This list is based on Shear, 2011, sorted alphabetically by order and taxonomically within order.

Note: The names of millipede orders end in "-ida"; suborders end in "-idea". Superfamilies end in "-oidea", while families end in "-idae".

Callipodida 

Suborder Callipodidea
 Callipodidae
Suborder Schizopetalidea
 Abacionidae
 Caspiopetalidae
 Dorypetalidae
 Paracortinidae
 Schizopetalidae
Suborder Sinocallipodidea
 Sinocallipodidae

Chordeumatida

Suborder Chordeumatidea 
Superfamily Chordeumatoidea
 Chordeumatidae
 Speophilosomatidae

Suborder Craspedosomatidea 
Superfamily Anthroleucosomatoidea
 Anthroleucosomatidae
 Haasiidae
 Origmatogonidae
 Vandeleumatidae
Superfamily Brannerioidea
 Brachychaeteumatidae
 Branneriidae
 Chamaesomatidae
 Golovatchiidae
 Heterolatzeliidae
 Kashmireumatidae
 Macrochaeteumatidae
 Niponiosomatidae
 Tingupidae
 Trachygonidae
Superfamily Cleidogonoidea
 Biokoviellidae
 Cleidogonidae
 Entomobielziidae
 Lusitaniosomatidae
 Opisthocheiridae
 Trichopetalidae
Superfamily Craspedosomatoidea 
 Attemsiidae
 Craspedosomatidae
 Haplobainosomatidae
Superfamily Haaseoidea
 Haaseidae
Superfamily Neoatractosomatoidea
 Altajellidae
 Faginidae
 Hoffmaneumatidae
 Mastigophorophyllidae
 Neoatractosomatidae
Superfamily Verhoeffioidea
 Verhoeffiidae

Suborder Heterochordeumatidea 
Superfamily Conotyloidea
 Adritylidae
 Conotylidae
Superfamily Diplomaragnoidea
 Diplomaragnidae
Superfamily Heterochordeumatoidea
 Eudigonidae
 Heterochordeumatidae
 Megalotylidae
 Metopidiotrichidae
 Peterjohnsiidae
Superfamily Pygmaeosomatoidea
 Lankasomatidae
 Pygmaeosomatidae

Suborder Striariidea 
Superfamily Caseyoidea
 Caseyidae
 Urochordeumatidae
Superfamily Striarioidea
 Apterouridae
 Buotidae
 Rhiscosomididae
 Striariidae

Glomerida 

 Glomeridae
Glomeridellidae
Trachysphaeridae (=Doderiidae)

Glomeridesmida 
 Glomeridesmidae
 Termitodesmidae

Julida 
Superfamily Blaniuloidea
 Blaniulidae
 Galliobatidae
 Okeanobatidae
 Zosteractinidae
Superfamily Juloidea
 Julidae
 Rhopaloiulidae
 Trichoblaniulidae
 Trichonemasomatidae
Superfamily Nemasomatoidea
 Chelojulidae
 Nemasomatidae
 Pseudonemasomatidae
 Telsonemasomatidae

Superfamily Paeromopodoidea
 Aprosphylosomatidae
 Paeromopodidae
Superfamily  Parajuloidea
 Mongoliulidae
 Parajulidae

Platydesmida 

 Andrognathidae
 Platydesmidae

Polydesmida

Suborder Chelodesmidea (=Leptodesmidea) 
Superfamily Chelodesmoidea
 Chelodesmidae
Superfamily Platyrhacoidea
 Aphelidesmidae
 Platyrhacidae
Superfamily Rhachodesmoidea
 Rhachodesmidae
 Tridontomidae
Superfamily Sphaeriodesmoidea
 Campodesmidae
 Holistophallidae
 Sphaeriodesmidae
Superfamily Xystodesmoidea

 Eurymerodesmidae
 Euryuridae
 Gomphodesmidae
 Oxydesmidae
 Xystodesmidae

Suborder Dalodesmidea 
 Dalodesmidae
 Vaalogonopodidae

Suborder Paradoxosomatidea (=Strongylosomatidea) 
 Paradoxosomatidae

Suborder Polydesmidea

Infraorder Oniscodesmoides 
 
Superfamily Oniscodesmoidea
 Dorsoporidae
 Oniscodesmidae
Superfamily Pyrgodesmoidea
 Ammodesmidae
 Cyrtodesmidae
 Pyrgodesmidae

Infraorder Polydesmoides 
Superfamily Haplodesmoidea
 Haplodesmidae
Superfamily Opisotretoidea
 Opisotretidae
 Polydesmidae
 Cryptodesmidae
 Polydesmidae
Superfamily Trichopolydesmoidea
 Fuhrmannodesmidae
 Macrosternodesmidae
 Nearctodesmidae

Polyxenida

Superfamily Polyxenoidea
 Hypogexenidae
 Lophoproctidae
 Polyxenidae
Superfamily Synxenoidea
 Synxenidae

Polyzoniida 

 Hirudisomatidae
 Polyzoniidae
 Siphonotidae

Siphoniulida 
 Siphoniulidae

Siphonocryptida 
 Siphonocryptidae

Siphonophorida 

 Siphonophoridae
 Siphonorhinidae

Sphaerotheriida 

 Arthrosphaeridae
 Procyliosomatidae
 Sphaerotheriidae
 Zephroniidae

Spirobolida

Suborder Spirobolidea 

 Allopocockiidae
 Atopetholidae
 Floridobolidae
 Hoffmanobolidae
 Messicobolidae
 Pseudospirobolellidae
 Rhinocricidae
 Spirobolellidae
 Spirobolidae
 Typhlobolellidae

Suborder Trigoniulidea 
 Pachybolidae
 Trigoniulidae

Spirostreptida

Suborder Cambalidea 
 Cambalidae
 Cambalopsidae
 Choctellidae
 Iulomorphidae
 Pseudonannolenidae

Suborder Spirostreptidea 

Superfamily Odontopygoidea
 Atopogestidae
 Odontopygidae
Superfamily Spirostreptoidea
 Adiaphorostreptidae
 Harpagophoridae
 Spirostreptidae

Stemmiulida 

 Stemmiulidae

See also 
Extinct millipede groups
Archipolypoda
Arthropleuridea

References

 
millipede families
Myriapoda